Ken Lee, a 59-year-old man, was fatally stabbed outside the Strathcona Hotel, on York Street, Toronto, at 12:17 am on December 18, 2022. Eight teenage girls were charged with his murder.

The alleged perpetrators are suspected of two prior violent incidents also in downtown Toronto the same evening and are understood by police to have associated via social media, but not met in person prior to the evening of the attack.

Background 
The eight suspects, according to Toronto Police Service, were engaged in two violent incidents in the hours prior to Lee's stabbing, one at St. Andrew subway station and another at the intersection of York Street, Front Street and University Avenue.

Earlier in 2022, similar thefts that were also described as swarming attacks by police occurred in the same area of Toronto.

Stabbing 
The stabbing occurred at 12:17 am on December 18, 2022 in downtown Toronto, outside the Strathcona Hotel, on the corner of York Street and University Avenue, near both Union Station and the Royal York Hotel. Strathcona Hotel was converted for use as a shelter for homeless people during the COVID-19 pandemic.

Toronto Police Service reported that eight teenagers allegedly swarmed Lee over a three-minute period, repeatedly stabbing him. The incident occurred hours before the nearby Vaughan shooting. Bystanders summoned emergency services to just north of Union Station. Lee was transported to a nearby hospital, where he died.

Various weapons were found by police near the location of the stabbing.

A witness told CBC News that she was with Lee prior to the attack and that the teenage girls attempted to steal her alcoholic beverage, before the Lee tried to protect her from the teenagers.

Victim 
Ken Lee, aged 59, was staying in a nearby homeless shelter. Witnesses told CTV News that the Lee was visiting a friend who was living at the Strathcona Hotel shelter.

Police said that Lee was holding a liquor bottle at the time of the attack and that the theft of the alcoholic beverage was likely a motive for the attack. Police also said they do not believe the victim knew any of the attackers.

Lee lived in Toronto and was an immigrant from Hong Kong.

Suspects 

Eight girls aged between 13 and 16 years were arrested near the location of the stabbing just after midnight on the day of the attack. Three of the suspects were aged 13, three were 14, and two were 16. 

According to police, the alleged perpetrators all lived in different parts of Toronto and had only met online via social media, not in person, prior to the day of the attack. The girls lived in locations that included Scarborough, Etobicoke, downtown Toronto, and in the part of the 905 belt west of Toronto.

Aftermath 
Each of the accused appeared at the Old City Hall court on the day that they were arrested. They were later each charged with second-degree murder on December 20. At at December 29 court hearing one girl was released on bail. The other seven appeared in court on January 5, 2023 via video link. CTV News noted that "only two parents of the seven co-accused appeared to be in attendance for virtual proceedings on Zoom" and that some of the suspects seemed confused, with one of their lawyers not present during an accused's questioning. By February 13 2023, five of the suspects were released from detention on bail, while three remained detained.

Tracy Vaillancourt, a Canada Research Chair in children’s mental health and violence prevention, noting the gender and age of the suspects, described it as atypical for adolescent girls to be involved in an event that could result in a charge of murder. Jooyoung Lee, a crime and sociologist expert on crime from the University of Toronto said that two high-profile fatal attacks occurring on the same day can give the public the incorrect perception that crime is rising, which is the opposite of the trend in Toronto.

Toronto Mayor John Tory said he was "deeply disturbed" by the killing. Police Detective Sergeant Terry Browne said "I've been in policing for almost 35 years and you think you've seen it all...If this isn't alarming and shocking to everyone, then we're all in trouble quite frankly."

Lee's family were critical of how the Youth Criminal Justice Act protected the identify of the eight accused child suspects.

See also 
 Murder of Reena Virk
 Toronto machete attack
 List of youngest killers

References

Stabbing
December 2022 events in Canada
Attacks in Canada in 2022
Crime and children
Deaths by stabbing in Canada
Crime in Toronto
Stabbing attacks in Canada